Vivian Ann Davidson Hewitt (February 17, 1920 – May 29, 2022) was an American art collector, specializing in African-American art, and a former librarian.  She was Pittsburgh’s first African American librarian, and later became the first African American president of the Special Libraries Association.   Her art collection, which she and her husband, John Hewitt, amassed over fifty years, is considered one of the finest collections of artwork by African-American artists and is on exhibit at the Harvey B. Gantt Center for African-American Arts + Culture in Charlotte, N.C. In 2016, she was awarded the honorary title of Dame by Queen Elizabeth II of Great Britain.

Biography

Early life 
Vivian Davidson was born in New Castle, Pennsylvania, on February 17, 1920. She was the fourth, out of five, children to Arthur Davidson, a waiter and butler, and his wife Lela, a teacher. Her parents were born in North Carolina; they moved to New Castle when Arthur was offered the position of butler to a Pennsylvania senator. Vivian Davidson attended the North Street School, George Washington Junior High and New Castle Senior High.

Professional career 
Davidson received her bachelor's degree from Geneva College, in Beaver Falls, Pennsylvania, in 1943. The following year, in 1944, she received a master's in library science from Carnegie Library of Pittsburgh. Hewitt was hired as the senior assistant librarian by the Carnegie Library of Pittsburgh following her graduation. She is believed to be the first African-American librarian in Pittsburgh.

In 1949, she moved to Atlanta, accepting a position as an instructor-librarian at Atlanta University (now Clark Atlanta University). She met her husband, John H. Hewitt a professor at Morehouse College, in 1949 and they were married the same year. Their only child, John Hamilton Hewitt III was then born in 1952. In 1953 Hewitt moved to New York City and worked for the Crowell-Collier Publishing Co., then moved to be the librarian at the Rockefeller Foundation. Hewitt then became the librarian for the Carnegie Endowment for International Peace, in 1963 until her retirement in 1983. She also served as the first black president of the Special Libraries Association (SLA) from 1978-1979.

John and Vivian Hewitt Art Collection 
Vivian and John Hewitt began collecting artwork when they traveled, focusing particularly on Haitian art. They also personally knew and collected artwork from New York-based African-American artists. Over fifty years, they purchased hundreds of sketches, paintings, and etchings.  Fifty-eight pieces from this collection were purchased by Bank of America and donated to the Afro-American Cultural Center in Charlotte, North Carolina. The Center was renamed the Harvey B. Gantt Center for African-American Arts + Culture in 2009. The John and Vivian Hewitt Collection of African-American Art includes work by Romare Bearden, Margaret Burroughs, Elizabeth Catlett, Jonathan Green, Jacob Lawrence, Ann Tanksley, and Henry Ossawa Tanner. The Hewitts also donated about 60 pieces of art to Geneva College, her alma mater. These pieces are in a collection named the Vivian Davidson Hewitt Collection, on permanent display in the East Reading Room of the Macartney Library.

Personal life 
Hewitt died at her home in Manhattan on May 29, 2022, at the age of 102.

Awards 
In 1984, Vivian Hewitt was inducted into the Special Libraries Association's Hall of Fame.

In 2001, she was honored by Queen Elizabeth II with appointment to the Venerable Order of St John as a Serving Sister. She was promoted to Officer Sister in 2004, Commander Sister in 2009, and finally Dame in 2016.

External Links 
The Vivian D. and John H. Hewitt Collection, Special Collections and Archives, African American Research Library and Cultural Center, Broward County Library.

References 

1920 births
2022 deaths
American art collectors
American librarians
American women librarians
African-American librarians
People from New Castle, Pennsylvania
Geneva College alumni
Clark Atlanta University faculty
Rockefeller Foundation people
Carnegie Endowment for International Peace
African-American centenarians
American centenarians
Women centenarians